Barbara Guest, née Barbara Ann Pinson (September 6, 1920 – February 15, 2006), was an American poet and prose stylist. Guest first gained recognition as a member of the first generation New York School of poetry. Guest wrote more than 15 books of poetry spanning sixty years of writing. In 1999, she was awarded the Frost Medal for Lifetime Achievement by the Poetry Society of America. Guest also wrote art criticism, essays, and plays.  Her collages appeared on the covers of several of her books of poetry. She was also well known for her biography of the poet H.D., Herself Defined: The Poet H.D. and Her World (1984).

Born in Wilmington, North Carolina and raised in California, Guest attended UCLA, and then earned a B.A. in General Curriculum-Humanities in 1943 at UC Berkeley. She worked as an editorial associate at ARTnews magazine from 1951-1959.

Poetry 
Barbara Guest wrote more than 15 books of poetry spanning sixty years of writing. "Her poems begin in the midst of action," wrote Peter Gizzi in his introduction to a collection of her work, "but their angle of perception is oblique." Her poems are known for their abstract quality, vivid language, and intellectualism. She believed that the subject of the poem finds itself through the writing of the poem and through the poet's imagination. "Disturbing the conventional relations of subjects and objects, of reality and imagination, is one of Guest's signature gestures," noted Gizzi.

Among her most well-known poems are "Parachutes, My Love, Could Carry Us Higher," (MP3) "Wild Gardens Overlooked by Night Lights, (MP3)" "Roses," and "Photographs."

Quotes

Selected bibliography
The Location of Things (Tibor de Nagy, 1960)
Poems: The Location of Things, Archaics, The Open Skies (Doubleday & Company, 1962)
The Open Skies (1962)
The Blue Stairs (Corinth Books, 1968)
I Ching, with lithographs by Sheila Isham (Mourlot Graphics, 1969).
Moscow Mansions (Viking, 1973)
The Countess from Minneapolis (Burning Deck Press, 1976)
Seeking Air (Black Sparrow, 1977; reprint, Los Angeles: Sun & Moon Press, 1997; Grand Iota, 2021)
The Türler Losses (Montréal: Mansfield Book Mart, 1979)
Biography (Burning Deck, 1980)
Quilts (Vehicle Edition, 1981)
Herself Defined: The Poet H. D. and Her World (Doubleday & Company, 1984)
Musicality, with June Felter (1988)
Fair Realism (Sun & Moon Press, 1989)
The Nude, Warren Brandt (Art Editions, New York, 1989)
Defensive Rapture (Sun & Moon Press, 1993)
The Altos, with artist Richard Tuttle (San Francisco: Hank Hine Publisher, 1993)
Selected Poems (Sun & Moon Press, 1995)
Stripped Tales, featuring art by Anne Dunn (Kelsey St. Press, 1995)
Quill Solitary, Apparition (The Post-Apollo Press, 1996)
Seeking Air (Sun & Moon Press, 1997)
Etruscan Reader VI (with Robin Blaser and Lee Harwood) (1998)
Outside of This, That is, with illustration by Trevor Winkfield (Z Press, 1999).
Strings, with artist Ann Slacik (Paris, France, 1999)
The Luminous, with artist Jane Moorman (Palo Alto, California, 1999)
Rocks on a Platter (Wesleyan, 1999)
If So, Tell Me (Reality Street Editions, UK, 1999)
The Confetti Trees (Sun & Moon, 1999)
Symbiosis, with artist Laurie Reid (Berkeley: Kelsey Street Press, 2000)
Miniatures and Other Poems (Wesleyan University Press, 2002)
Forces of Imagination: Writing on Writing (Kelsey Street Press, 2003)
Durer in the Window: Reflexions on Art (Roof Books, 2003)
The Red Gaze (Wesleyan University Press, 2005)
Fallschirme, Gebliebter. Ausgewählte Gedichte (German, Bilingual Edition, luxbooks, 2008)
 The Collected Poems of Barbara Guest (Middletown, CT: Wesleyan University Press, 2008)

External links
'Weather and Cinnamon: Late Changes in Major Poems by Barbara Guest' Cordite Poetry Review

Barbara Guest Memory Bank A gathering of brief memoirs and BG poems (selected by her readers) to honor the life and writing of Barbara Guest
Review of 'The Red Gaze' at poetry magazine "Intercapillary Space"
Chicago Review special issue on Guest
"Add-Verse" a poetry-photo-video project Guest participated in
 - this is a link to "selections" from "The gendered marvelous...", an essay by Rachel Blau DuPlessis
“Selfish Enchantments”: Barbara Guest and the Nature of Arrangement This essay by U.S. poet Ben Lerner first appeared in New American Writing, number 27
Barbara Guest on Penn Sound. Extensive archive of recordings and interviews with Barbara Guest.
Barbara Guest Papers. Yale Collection of American Literature, Beinecke Rare Book and Manuscript Library, Yale University.

References

20th-century American poets
Modernist women writers
New York School poets
1920 births
2006 deaths
Writers from Wilmington, North Carolina
American women poets
20th-century American women writers
University of California, Berkeley alumni
Poets from California
PEN Oakland/Josephine Miles Literary Award winners
21st-century American women